The Big Snowy Formation is a geologic formation in Montana. It preserves fossils dating back to the Carboniferous period.

See also

 List of fossiliferous stratigraphic units in Montana
 Paleontology in Montana

References
 

Carboniferous Montana